The Volcano Lover is an historical novel by Susan Sontag, published in 1992. Set largely in Naples, it focuses upon Emma Hamilton, her marriage to Sir William Hamilton, the scandal relating to her affair with Lord Nelson, her abandonment, and her descent into poverty. The title comes from William Hamilton's interest in volcanoes, and his investigations of Mount Vesuvius.

Reception
The Volcano Lover has largely been praised by literary critics. Lettie Ransley of The Guardian called it "as big, rich and complex as one might expect" and wrote,The Volcano Lover is a powerful, intricate novel of ideas: frequently inflected with Sontag's feminism, it applies a modern lens to the Enlightenment's moral, social and aesthetic concerns. Yet it is also a tender inventory of desire: intricately mapping the modulation from the cold mania of the collector to the lover's passion.

The writer John Banville praised the work, noting that Sontag's decision to write a romantic historical novel was "a surprise." He remarked, "The Volcano Lover, despite a few nods of acknowledgment toward post-modernist self-awareness, is a big, old-fashioned broth of a book. Sir Walter Scott would surely have approved of it; in fact, he would probably have enjoyed it immensely."

Candia McWilliam of The Independent lauded the book, opining:
The novel was also praised by Michiko Kakutani of The New York Times.

References

1992 novels
American historical novels
Cultural depictions of Horatio Nelson
Cultural depictions of Emma, Lady Hamilton
Farrar, Straus and Giroux books
Novels set in Naples
Novels set in the 19th century
Postmodern novels
Works by Susan Sontag